The 3rd unofficial Chess Olympiad was held by German Chess Federation (Grossdeutscher Schachbund) as a counterpart of the 1936 Summer Olympics in Berlin with reference to 1924 and 1928 events. Many Jewish chess players took part in the event. Significantly, the "Jewish" teams of Hungary (i.e. Lajos Steiner, Endre Steiner, László Szabó, Ernő Gereben, Kornél Havasi) and Poland (i.e. Paulino Frydman, Miguel Najdorf, Henryk Friedman, Leon Kremer, Henryk Pogorieły) beat "Aryan" Germany. Also Jewish masters from other countries played leading roles there (i.e. Movsas Feigins, Gunnar Friedemann, Imre König, Lodewijk Prins, Isakas Vistaneckis, Emil Zinner, etc.).

The Schach-Olympia 1936 took place in Munich between August 17 and September 1, 1936. In that extra-Olympiad (non-FIDE) 208 participants, representing 21 countries, played 1680 games. The Munich unofficial Olympiad was the biggest team competition ever held.

Results

Final

{| class="wikitable sortable"
! # !!Country !! Points
|-
| style="background:gold;"|1 ||  || 110.5 
|-
| style="background:silver;"|2 ||  || 108
|-
| style="background:#cc9966;"|3 ||  || 106.5
|-
| 4 ||  || 104.5
|-
| 5 ||  || 104
|-
| 6 ||  || 96.5
|-
| 7 ||  || 95
|-
| 8 ||  || 94
|-
| 9 ||  || 91.5
|-
| 10 ||  || 90
|-
| 11 ||  || 77.5
|-
| 12 ||  || 75
|-
| 13 ||  || 71.5
|-
| 14 ||  || 68
|-
| 15 ||  || 64.5
|-
| 16 ||  || 63
|-
| 17 ||  || 61.5
|-
| 18 ||  || 59
|-
| 19 ||  || 57.5
|-
| 20 ||  || 43.5
|-
| 21 ||  || 38.5
|}

Team medals

{| class="wikitable sortable"
! # !!Country !! Players
|-
| style="background:gold;"|1 ||  || Géza Maróczy, Lajos Steiner, Endre Steiner, Kornél Havasi, László Szabó, Gedeon Barcza, Árpád Vajda, Ernő Gereben, János Balogh, Imre Kóródy Keresztély 
|-
| style="background:silver;"|2 ||  || Paulin Frydman, Mieczysław Najdorf, Teodor Regedziński, Kazimierz Makarczyk, Henryk Friedman, Leon Kremer, Henryk Pogorieły, Antoni Wojciechowski, Franciszek Sulik, Jerzy Jagielski 
|-
| style="background:#cc9966;"|3 ||  || Kurt Richter, Carl Ahues, Ludwig Engels, Carl Carls, Ludwig Rellstab, Fritz Sämisch, Ludwig Rödl, Herbert Heinicke, Wilhelm Ernst, Paul Michel
|}

Individual medals

{| class="wikitable sortable"
! # Board !! Player !! Country !! Points !! Games !! % 
|-
| style="background:gold;"|1 || Paul Keres ||  || 15.5 || 20 || 77.5
|-
| style="background:silver;"|1 || Vasja Pirc ||  || 12 || 17 || 70.6
|-
| style="background:#cc9966;"|1 || Gideon Ståhlberg||  || 11.5 || 17 || 67.6
|-
| style="background:gold;"|2 || Mieczysław Najdorf ||  || 16 || 20 || 80.0
|-
| style="background:silver;"|2 || Lajos Steiner ||  || 15.5 || 20 || 77.5
|-
| style="background:#cc9966;"|2 || Albert Becker||  || 13.5 || 18 || 75.0
|-
| style="background:gold;"|3 || Bjørn Nielsen ||  || 11.5 || 15 || 76.7
|-
| style="background:silver;"|3 || Movsas Feigins ||  || 14.5 || 19 || 76.3
|-
| style="background:#cc9966;"|3 || Emil Zinner||  || 14.5 || 20 || 72.5 
|-
| style="background:gold;"|4 || Karel Hromádka ||  || 14 || 20 || 70.0
|-
| style="background:silver;"|4 || Gösta Danielsson ||  || 13.5 || 20 || 67.5 
|-
| style="background:silver;"|4 || Markas Luckis||  || 13.5 || 20 || 67.5
|-
| style="background:gold;"|5 || László Szabó ||  || 16.5 || 19 || 86.8
|-
| style="background:silver;"|5 || Henryk Friedman ||  || 15.5 || 20 || 77.5
|-
| style="background:#cc9966;"|5 || Ludwig Rellstab ||  || 12 || 17 || 70.6
|-
| style="background:gold;"|6 || Borislav Kostić||  || 16 || 19 || 84.2
|-
| style="background:silver;"|6 || Leon Kremer ||  || 15 || 20 || 75.0
|-
| style="background:#cc9966;"|6 || Feliks Villard||  || 13 || 19 || 68.4
|-
| style="background:gold;"|7 || Ludwig Rödl  ||  || 11 || 16 || 68.8
|-
| style="background:silver;"|7 || Alfred Christensen ||  || 13 || 19 || 68.4
|-
| style="background:#cc9966;"|7 || Henryk Pogorieły||  || 13.5 || 20 || 67.5
|-
| style="background:gold;"|8 || Wolfgang Weil ||  || 12.5 || 17 || 73.5
|-
| style="background:silver;"|8 || Herbert Heinicke ||  || 13 || 18 || 72.2
|-
| style="background:#cc9966;"|8 || Karlis Ozols||  || 10.5 || 15 || 70.0
|-
| style="background:gold;"|1 reserve || František Zíta ||  || 7.5 || 11 || 68.2
|-
| style="background:silver;"|1 reserve || Wilhelm Ernst ||  || 9.5 || 14 || 67.9
|-
| style="background:#cc9966;"|1 reserve || János Balogh ||  || 8.5 || 13 || 65.4
|-
| style="background:gold;"|2 reserve || Ozren Nedeljković||  || 8 || 10 || 80.0
|-
| style="background:silver;"|2 reserve || Paul Michel ||  || 9.5 || 12 || 79.2
|-
| style="background:#cc9966;"|2 reserve || Bertil Sundberg||  || 10.5 || 15 || 70.0
|}

See also

 1st unofficial Chess Olympiad (Paris 1924)
 2nd unofficial Chess Olympiad (Budapest 1926)
 Against Chess Olympiad (Tripoli 1976)

References

External links
Edward Winter, The 1936 Munich Chess Olympiad

Unofficial 03
Olympiad Unofficial 03
Chess Olympiad Unofficial 03
Olympiad Unofficial 03
Chess Olympiad Unofficial 03
1930s in Munich
August 1936 sports events
September 1936 sports events